Boca Juniors is an Argentine professional football club based in Buenos Aires. The club first participated in a South American competition in 1919. The first international cup they took part in was the Copa Aldao in which they participated as champions of Argentina. The club competed in AFA/AUF cups from 1919 to 1946 and since entering the Copa Libertadores, in 1963, the club has competed in every CONMEBOL-organized competition, except the Copa CONMEBOL, Intercontinental Champions' Supercup, Suruga Bank Championship, Copa Merconorte, Copa Master de CONMEBOL and Copa Ganadores de Copa, most of them are extinct.

Internationally, Boca Juniors has won a total of 22 international titles, with 18 organised by CONMEBOL and the rest organised jointly by the Argentine and Uruguayan Associations. Besides, the club is the second most successful team in the Copa Libertadores with 6 titles in 1977, 1978, 2000, 2001, 2003 and 2007, only behind CA Independiente. The club has also won the Recopa Sudamericana four times, in 1990, 2005, 2006 and 2008; and the Copa Sudamericana two times in 2004 and 2005, which is more than any other club for both trophies. Also, Boca won the Intercontinental Cup three times, in 1977, 2000 and 2003. 

Behind Real Madrid (26) and Al-Ahly (24), Boca Juniors is one of the most successful clubs in the world in terms of number of international titles (22).

Overall record

The debut of Boca in international competitions took place in the 1919 as a participant in the Tie Cup. Boca participated in 6 AFA/AUF competitions and won 4, which are now fully recognised by CONMEBOL and FIFA. They are all defunct. Since 1963, Boca has regularly competed in CONMEBOL/FIFA competitions, the club registers 73 participations, winning 18 titles, they are listed in order of appearance. In bold, current competitions.  Legend: GF = Goals For. GA = Goals Against. GD = Goal Difference.

Competitions
Notes "(H)" denotes home ground, "(A)" denotes away ground and "(N)" symbolises neutral ground. The first score is always Boca's.

In South America, matches between clubs from different countries date back to the beginning of the 20th century, with the Rio de la Plata football championships. They were official competitions held jointly by the Argentine and the Uruguayan Associations, before Conmebol was created. Those tournaments include Copa Aldao –contested by the league champions of both associations–, the Copa de Honor Cousenier –contested by winners of "Honor Cups" in both sides– and the Cup Tie Competition, contested by winners of "Copa de Competencia" in both countries. Boca Juniors also participated in the Copa Escobar-Gerona (created when Conmebol already existed), winning two titles. Conmebol has mentioned those competitions as "the first official and international matches between clubs in South America". 
The South American Football Confederation (CONMEBOL) has organized different competitions at club level throughout history. The first competition organized by Conmebol was the South American Championship of Champions in 1948, at the initiative of the Colo-Colo club, which had the idea of organizing a tournament with the champions of each of the local leagues in South America, and the winner was designated as the South American champion. After this contest, the dispute of the official international championships was interrupted until 1960, when the South American teams began to participate in the Copa de Campeones de América, which adopted the name of Copa Libertadores de América in 1965. At the beginning, only the league champions participated, but with the passing of the editions, the number of participating teams has expanded. Due to this, the Argentine Soccer Association (AFA) has developed different classification methods for Conmebol tournaments. The formats were varying on the different occasions in which they were implemented, in addition to having different amounts of places to participate in the maximum international tournament. Over the years, many competitions were implemented, of which most were discontinued. The FIFA competitions are the Intercontinental Cup/FIFA Club World Cup, to which can only qualify by virtue of winning the Copa Libertadores.

Copa Aldao
The Copa Aldao was a AFA/AUF club competition contested annually, albeit irregularly, between the league champions of Argentina and Uruguay. The cup is one of several inter-South American club competitions that have been organised on the continent. The first competition was scheduled for the 1913 season (although it was never played) and the last in 1955 (actually played in 1959, no champions proclaimed). The Copa Ricardo Aldao is seen today as the first stepping-stone into the creation of Copa Libertadores. Boca played in 1919, 1920, and 1940, but could never win the title.

Tie Cup
The Tie Cup was a football tournament played between representatives of the Argentina and Uruguay Associations. It was one of the earliest international football tournaments played between members of different national football associations, played on an annual basis until 1919. The competition was inspired by English FA Cup. Boca played and won in 1919, in the last edition of the tournament.

Copa de Honor Cousenier
The Copa de Honor Cousenier was an international football club competition which was played 13 times between representatives of the Argentina and Uruguay associations between 1905 and 1920. The trophy was donated by "E. Cusenier Fils Auné & Cie.", a French liqueur company. The format of the cup consisted in a final between the last champions of Argentine Copa de Honor and Uruguayan Copa de Honor. If necessary, a second match was played. It was similar to Tie Cup but the final games were played at Montevideo instead of Buenos Aires. Boca played and won in 1920, in the last edition of the tournament.

Copa Escobar-Gerona
The Copa Escobar-Gerona was an official football competition organized by both bodies, the Argentine and Uruguayan football association, being first held in 1941. The Cup was played between the Primera División runners-up of Argentina and Uruguay, with a two match format, played in each country. This competition was played simultaneously with the Copa Aldao. The trophy was donated by Mr. Ramiro Jouan and named after Adrián Escobar and Héctor Gerona, presidents of the Argentine and Uruguayan associations respectively. Boca played and won in 1945 and 1946, in the last editions of the tournament.

Copa Libertadores
The Copa Libertadores is the highest level of competition in South American club football and has had several different formats over its lifetime. Boca first participated in 1963. The club is the second most successful team in the competition with 6 titles in 1977, 1978, 2000, 2001, 2003 and 2007, only behind Independiente. It is also the team with the most finals played (11) and is in third place in the historical table.

Copa Interamericana
The Copa Interamericana was an annual club football competition organized by CONCACAF and CONMEBOL from 1969, to 1998. The competition was supposed to be contested between the winners of the North American CONCACAF Champions League and the South American Copa Libertadores tournaments although the participants have varied at times. Boca participated only once, in 1978, as 1977 Copa Libertadores champion and lost against mexican side América. With the traditional format, Boca would have won the title, but the rules stipulated that to win the title more points had to be accumulated than the rival and no more goals, so an extra playoff had to be played, where Boca lost.

Supercopa Sudamericana
The Supercopa Libertadores, also known as the Supercopa Sudamericana, was a football club competition contested annually between 1988 and 1997 by the past winners of the Copa Libertadores. The competition was discontinued to make way for the Copa Mercosur and Copa Merconorte in 1998. Boca participated in all the editions, winning the 1989 edition and being runner-up in 1994.

Recopa Sudamericana
The Recopa Sudamericana is an annual international club football competition organized by CONMEBOL since 1988. It is a match-up between the champions of the previous year's Copa Libertadores and the Copa Sudamericana, South America's premier club competitions. The competition has had several formats over its lifetime. Initially, the champions of the Copa Libertadores and Supercopa Libertadores contested it. In 1998, the Supercopa Libertadores was discontinued and the Recopa went into a hiatus. The competition has been disputed with either a presently-used two-legged series or a single match-up at a neutral venue. Boca is the most successful club in the cup history, having won the tournament four times, in 1990, 2005, 2006 and 2008. The club also lost in the 2004 edition.

Copa Master de Supercopa
The Copa Master de Supercopa was a football competition contested by clubs that had previously won the Supercopa Libertadores. It was organized by CONMEBOL and only played in 1992 and 1995. The format of the tournament was different in both editions. Boca only played in the 1992 edition, tournament that won.

Copa de Oro
The Copa de Oro  was a football competition cup winners' cup competition contested on 3 occasions by the most recent winners of all CONMEBOL continental competitions. These included champions of the Copa Libertadores, Supercopa Sudamericana, Copa CONMEBOL, Copa Master de Supercopa and Copa Master de CONMEBOL. Boca only played in the 1993 edition, as 1992 Copa Master de Supercopa champion, and won the title, being the only club from Argentina to win the competition.

Copa Iberoamericana
The Copa Iberoamericana was an international official football competition. It was created to face the champions of the Copa de Oro and the Copa del Rey, because of an agreement signed between CONMEBOL and the Royal Spanish Football Federation. It was disputed only once between Boca Juniors and Real Madrid in 1994, with victory to the Spanish club. After two decades, in 2015 CONMEBOL recognised the Copa Iberoamericana as an official tournament.

Copa Mercosur
The Copa Mercosur was a football competition played from 1998 to 2001 by the traditional top clubs from Brazil, Argentina, Uruguay, Paraguay, and Chile. The competition was created by CONMEBOL to generate TV money to the participating teams, but it went beyond and ended up, together with the Copa Merconorte, as natural replacement to the CONMEBOL Cup. These two, Copa Merconorte and Copa Mercosur, were replaced in 2002 by the Copa Sudamericana. Boca played in all the editions and never advanced from the quarterfinal stage.

Copa Sudamericana
The Copa Sudamericana is an annual international club football competition organized by CONMEBOL since 2002, replacing the separate competitions Copa Merconorte and Copa Mercosur (that had replaced Copa CONMEBOL) by a single competition, so the Sudamericana is considered a merger of this three defunct tournaments. Since its introduction, the competition has been a pure elimination tournament with the number of rounds and teams varying from year to year. Boca Juniors was invited to the tournament between the editions 2002 to 2009 and with two titles, in 2004 and 2005, Boca is one of the most successful clubs in the cup's history, with Independiente and Athletico Paranaense. The club is the only one to win two consecutive editions.

Intercontinental Cup
In 1960, UEFA and CONMEBOL, created the Intercontinental Cup as a way of determining the best team in the world, by pitting the winners of the european UEFA Champions League and the South American Copa Libertadores against each other. As Copa Libertadores winner, Boca qualified to the 1977, 1978, 2000, 2001 and 2003, winning in 1977, 2000 and 2003 and losing in 2001. In 1978, European Cup champions Liverpool declined to participate, and Boca declined to face Brugge, the runners-up, leaving the edition undisputed. From 1960 to 1979, the Intercontinental Cup was played in two legs and from 1980, the final became a single match. Boca was one of the five teams to win 3 editions, with Milan, Peñarol, Real Madrid and Nacional.

FIFA Club World Cup
In 2000, FIFA launched their international club competition called the FIFA Club World Championship, featuring teams from all of its member associations. In the second edition — renamed the FIFA Club World Cup — in 2005, FIFA took over the Intercontinental Cup, subsuming it into its own competition. The current format of the tournament involves seven teams competing for the title at venues within the host nation over a period of about two weeks; the winners of that year's AFC Champions League (Asia), CAF Champions League (Africa), CONCACAF Champions League (North America), Copa Libertadores (South America), OFC Champions League (Oceania) and UEFA Champions League (Europe), along with the host nation's national champions, participate in a straight knock-out tournament. FIFA recognises the Intercontinental Cup as the sole direct predecessor of the Club World Cup, and the champions of both aforementioned competitions are the only ones uncontroversially officially recognised as Club World Champions in the FIFA Club World Cup Statistical Kit, the official document of FIFA's club competition. Boca initially qualified for the 2001 tournament, in Spain, but the competition was cancelled before it started. The club qualified for the 2007 edition as Copa Libertadores winner and lost in the final.

Overall results by opponent and country

Personal statistics

Top scorers

Most appearances

References

Boca Juniors records and statistics